The San Diego Seduction was a women's American football team in the Lingerie Football League that began play in the league's inaugural 2009–10 season. The Seduction was based in San Diego, California, with home games played at the San Diego Sports Arena. The team used the branding of the never launched San Francisco Seduction that was supposed to participate in the 2008 Lingerie Bowl. The team was suspended after the 2010–11 season citing the venue as the main concern and leaving the option to return by the 2012–13 season. The team was never reactivated.

2010–11 roster

Seasons

2009–10 schedule

2010–11 schedule

References

Legends Football League US teams
American football teams in San Diego
American football teams established in 2009
2009 establishments in California
Women's sports in California